The 1968–69 season was the 54th in the history of the Isthmian League, an English football competition.

Enfield were champions, winning the league for the second season in a row.

League table

References

Isthmian League seasons
I